Caodong school is a Chinese Chan Buddhist branch and one of the Five Houses of Chán. 

The school emphasised sitting meditation (Ch: zuochan, Jp: zazen), and the "five ranks" teaching. During the Song dynasty, Caodong masters like Honzhi developed "silent illumination" (mozhao) meditation.

Etymology
The key figure in the Caodong school was founder Dongshan Liangjie (807-869, 洞山良价, Jpn. Tozan Ryokai) and his heir Caoshan Benji (840-901, 曹山本寂, Ts'ao-shan Pen-chi, Jpn. Sōzan Honjaku). Some attribute the name "Cáodòng" as a union of "Dongshan" and "Caoshan". The "Cao" may also be from Cáoxī (曹溪), the "mountain-name" of Huineng, the Sixth Ancestor of Chan, as Caoshan was of little importance unlike his contemporary and fellow Dharma-heir, Yunju Daoying.

History
The Caodong school was founded by Dongshan Liangjie and his Dharma-heir Caoshan Benji. Dongshan traced back his lineage to Shitou Xiqian (700-790), a contemporary of Mazu Daoyi (709–788). Sayings to the effect that Shitou and Mazu were the two great masters of their day date from decades after their respective deaths. Shítóu's retrospective prominence owes much to the importance of Dongshan Liangjie. Shítóu does not appear to have been influential or famous during his lifetime: 

In the 11th century the Caodong-school nearly extinguished. Dayang Jingxuan (942-1027), the last descendant of the Caodong-lineage passed on his dharma-transmission via Fushan Fayuan, a teacher from the Linji school, to Fayuan's student Touzi Yiqing (1032-1083), who was born five years after Jingxuan's death.

During the Northern Song (960-1127) the Caodong was not successful in the social elite. The Linji school and Yunmen school dominated Chán. It was Touzi Yiqing's student Furong Daokai (1043-1118) who was a successful monastic, and revived the Caodong school.

His dharma "grandson" Hongzhi Zhengjue (1091-1157) became very successful among elite literati in the Southern Song (1127-1279), when the Imperial Court decreased their influence on society, and Chán schools became dependent on elite literati for support. Under Hongzhi and Zhengzie Qingliao, the Caodong school was revived and became one of the major traditions of Song dynasty Chan. 

These Song era teachers taught a practiced termed "silent illumination" or "serene reflection" (Ch: 默照禅) which relied on the doctrine of inherent enlightenment and buddha-nature. Since Buddha was seen as something already present in the mind, all that one needed to do was to let go of all striving and this was achieved by silently sitting in meditation. 

The success of the revived Caodong school drew opposition from Linji school figures like Dahui Zonggao, who promoted the Hua Tou method of koan practice, and attacked silent illumination as quietistic.

In 1227 Dōgen Zenji, a former Tendai student, studied Caodong Buddhism under Tiantong Rujing, and returned to Japan to establish the Sōtō sect. His lineage incorporates not only the dharma-transmission via Fushan Fayuan, but also Linji dharma-transmissions via Eisai and his student Myozen, a teacher of Dogen, and the Linji dharma-transmission of Dahui Zonggao via the Nōnin school.

Lineage chart
via Shitou the Caodong traces back its origins to Huineng.

See also 

 Dongshan Liangjie
 Index of Buddhism-related articles
 Schools of Buddhism
 Five Houses of Chán
 Linji school
 Sōtō
 Zazen
 Shikantaza

References

Written references

Web references

Sources

External links
 SOTO ZEN ANCESTORS IN CHINA
 Matthew Gindin (2008), The Bright Field of Spirit: The Life and Teachings of Chan Master Hongzhi Zhengjue

 Taigen Dan Leighton, Sōtō Zen (Caodong)

Chan schools